Konami Yoshida (formerly , born June 6, 1967) is a Japanese voice actress from Tokyo, Japan.

Filmography

Television animation
Woman (A) in Armored Police Metal Jack (1991)
Maria Shiratori, Hidenori Kondo in Matchless Raijin-Oh (1991)
Taeko in Crayon Shin-chan (1992)
Announcer in Genki Bakuhatsu Ganbaruger (1992)
Martina Kransky, Sofia Ierines, and Mizuho Minegan in Mobile Suit Victory Gundam (1993)
Kukuri in Magical Circle Guru Guru (1994)
Miku in Metal Fighter Miku (1994)
Umi Ryuuzaki in Magic Knight Rayearth (1994)
Kanako in Saint Tail (1995)
Hana Hatsuno and others in King of Braves GaoGaiGar (1997)
Tatsuko in Flame of Recca (1997)
Natsume in Generator Gawl (1998)
Michael in Digimon Adventure 02 (2000)
Alexandria Meat, Old Woman in Ultimate Muscle (2002)
Seiko Taniguchi in Futari wa Pretty Cure (2004)
Isamu Kaneda in Digimon Fusion (2012)
Sky Land Queen in Soaring Sky! Pretty Cure (2023)

Unknown date 

Shimarisu-kun in Bonobono
Robnos, Elly, and Gash Bell (ep142-end) in Konjiki no Gash Bell!!
Aoi Saotome in Chō Kuse ni Narisō
Cenicienta (101-102) in Sailor Moon S
Ruri Himeyuri in ToHeart ~Remember My Memories~ and To Heart 2
Lee Yeon Saeng in Jang Geum's Dream
Reki, Elkarena in Orphen

OVA
Azusa Kanzaki in Devil Hunter Yohko (1990)
Princess Sheila in Bastard!! (1992)
Hazuki Mizuhara in Tournament of the Gods (1997)

Theatre animation
Cassie in Venus Wars (1989)
Kukuri in Magical Circle Guru Guru (1996)

Video games
Seena Vanpied, Rei in Flash Hiders (1993)
Mai Amano, Arisu Shinohara in Idol Janshi Suchie-Pai II (1994)
Narrator in Policenauts (1994)
Mai Amano in Idol Janshi Suchie-Pai Special (1995)
Mai Amano in Idol Janshi Suchie-Pai Limited (1995)
Mai Amano in Idol Janshi Suchie-Pai Remix (1995)
Umi Ryuuzaki in Magic Knight Rayearth (1995)
Miku in Metal Fighter Miku (1995)
Mai Amano, Arisu Shinohara in Idol Janshi Suchie-Pai II Limited (1996)
Rick in Magic School Lunar! (1997)
Claris in Gun Bare! Game Tengoku (1998)
Area in Street Fighter EX (1999)
Alexandria Meat in Kinnikuman Generations (2004)
Alexandria Meat in Kinnikuman Muscle Grand Prix MAX (2006)
Biyomon in Digimon World Data Squad (2006)
Hiruko Taishoten in Oreshika: Tainted Bloodlines (2014)

Unknown date 
Kukuru in Arc the Lad series
Seena Vanpied in Battle Tycoon: Flash Hiders SFX
Kukuri in Mahoujin Guru Guru 1 & 2
Milly Kiliet and Fear Mell in Star Ocean and Star Ocean First Departure R
Alexandria Meat in Kinnikuman Muscle Generations
Nana Izumi, Hana Hatsuno, Pagliaccio, Z-Master, and Maria Shiratori in Super Robot Wars
Roll in the Rock Man Classic (Mega Man Classic) series (1998–2005)
Ruri Himeyuri in To Heart 2
MeeMee in the Super Monkey Ball Series

External links
 
 

1967 births
Living people
Japanese video game actresses
Japanese voice actresses
Voice actresses from Tokyo